Kuehn Malvezzi is an architectural practice in Berlin founded by Johannes Kuehn, Wilfried Kuehn and Simona Malvezzi in 2001. They work as exhibition designers, architects and curators, with a focus on museums and public spaces.

Kuehn Malvezzi's early projects include the exhibition spaces for Documenta11 in Kassel (2002) and the extension of the Rieckhallen at the Hamburger Bahnhof, Museum for Contemporary Art in Berlin (2004). In 2007 they were responsible for the conversion of a former industrial building to house of the Julia Stoschek Collection in Dusseldorf. They reorganized the historical and contemporary art collections of the Österreichische Galerie Belvedere at the Belvedere Palace in Vienna (2007); and the Liebieghaus sculpture collection in Frankfurt am Main (2009). Museum projects in Berlin include the extension of Museum Berggruen (2013); the Museum of Decorative Arts (2014), and the conversion of the Prinzessinnenpalais on Unter den Linden boulevard, to house the PalaisPopulaire – a venue for art, culture and sports by Deutsche Bank.

Kuehn Malvezzi took part in the competition for the Humboldt Forum in Berlin (2008), and attracted acclaim for their critical approach towards the reconstruction briefing. Their concept won the special jury prize, as well as the 2009 German Critics’ Prize in the architecture category.

In 2012 Kuehn Malvezzi won the international competition for the interreligious House of One in Berlin. On the site of Berlin’s earliest church at Petriplatz, a synagogue, a church and a mosque will be built under one roof, with construction due to start in 2020.

From 2006 - 2012 Wilfried Kuehn was professor for exhibition design and curatorial practice at the Staatliche Hochschule für Gestaltung Karlsruhe, and since 2018 he is professor in design at the Technical University Vienna. Johannes Kuehn has been professor at the Bauhaus-University Weimar since October 2016. Johannes Kuehn, Wilfried Kuehn and Simona Malvezzi are visiting professors at the Harvard Graduate School of Design in 2019.

Projects 
 PHI Contemporary, Montreal, Canada, conversion and new construction for a contemporary art institution, with Pelletier de Fontenay and Jodoin Lamarre Pratte architectes (Competition 1st Prize, 2022)
 Bâtiment d'art contemporian (BAC), Geneva, redesign and extension, with CCHE Genève (Competition 1st Prize 2022)
 Insectarium Montreal, with Pelletier de Fontenay and Jodoin Lamarre Pratte architectes, 2022 (Competition 1st Prize 2014)
 Holzmarktstrasse, commercial building ensemble, Berlin, construction 2022
 ZAC Saint-Vincent-de-Paul, Lot Petit, Housing, Paris, with Nicolas Dorval-Bory and Plan Común (competition 1st Prize 2019)
 Administrative building with rooftop greenhouse, Oberhausen, 2019
 Hartenbergpark Mainz, residential development (competition 1st Prize, 2016)
 X-D-E-P-O-T, Die Neue Sammlung – The Design Museum, Pinakothek der Moderne, Munich, 2020
 House of One, Berlin (competition 1st Prize, 2012)
 PalaisPopulaire by Deutsche Bank, conversion Prinzessinenpalais, Berlin, 2018
 Commercial Building Hohe Strasse, Cologne, 2018
 Mariendom Linz, conversion of the sanctuary, with Heimo Zobernig 2018
 DAAD-galerie, Berliner Künstlerprogramm des DAAD, Berlin 2017
 Villengarten am Relenberg, residential development, Stuttgart, 2017
 Extension of the Modern Gallery (Moderne Galerie), Saarland Museum, Saarbrücken, 2017
 Herzog Anton Ulrich Museum, new design for the museum collection, Braunschweig, 2016
 Galerie Neu, Berlin 2015
 MMK2 im Taunusturm, Museum für Moderne Kunst, Frankfurt am Main 2014
 Karlstrasse 47, commercial and residential building, Munich, 2014
 Joseph Pschorr House, commercial and residential building, Munich, 2014
 Torstrasse 86 Berlin, new residential building with retail spaces, Berlin 2014
 Museum of Decorative Arts Berlin, conversion and restructuring of the collection, Berlin 2014
 Komuna Fundamento, 13th Venice Architecture Biennale, 2012
 Extension Museum Berggruen, Berlin 2013
 Chalet 7 – Gesundheitszentrum Wetzlgut, new construction, Bad Gastein 2012
 Skihütte Rossalm, new construction, Bad Gastein 2010
 Belvedere Museum, conversion of listed building and new passageway to the Orangery, with artist Heimo Zobernig, Vienna 2008, 2009
 Liebieghaus, museological redesign and refurbishment, Frankfurt 2008, 2009
 Candida Höfer Stiftung, conversion and Extension, Cologne 2008
 Julia Stoschek Collection, conversion of an industrial building for the presentation of the collection, Düsseldorf, 2007
 Lauder Business School, extension of the college and boarding school, Vienna, 2006
 Berlinische Galerie, museum foyer and forecourt, Berlin 2004
 Schirn Kunsthalle, foyer and guidance system, Frankfurt 2002
 Documenta11, conversion Binding-Brauerei and exhibition venues, Kassel 2002

Publications (Selection) 
 Saarlandmuseum – Moderne Galerie. The Extension. Stiftung Saarländischer Kulturbesitz, Saarbrücken 2017, .
 Kuehn Malvezzi. Mousse Publishing, Milan 2013, .
 Typen. Ein Raumatlas. (Sonderausgabe Displayer). Ausstellungsdesign und kuratorische Praxis. Karlsruhe 2012, .
 Displayer 03 HfG Karlsruhe, Ausstellungsdesign und kuratorische Praxis. Karlsruhe 2009, .
 Candida Hoefer. Kuehn Malvezzi. Verlag Walther König, Köln 2009, .
 Displayer 02 HfG Karlsruhe, Ausstellungsdesign und kuratorische Praxis. Karlsruhe 2008, .
 Kuehn Malvezzi. Exhibition Catalogue, Aedes West. Berlinische Galerie, Berlin 2005, .
 Michael S. Riedel: Kuehn Malvezzi, Exhibition Catalogue, Aedes West, Berlinische Galerie Berlin. Revolver-Verlag, Frankfurt am Main 2005, .
 Behles & Jochimsen, Oda Paelmke, Tobias Engelschall, Jessen + Vollenweider, Kuehn Malvezzi: Berlin shrink to fit. Exhibition Catalogue, Revolver, Frankfurt 2005, .
 Friedrich Christian Flick Collection im Hamburger Bahnhof. Kuehn Malvezzi - a Space for Contemporary Art. Junius Verlag, Hamburg 2004, .

References

External links 
 http://kuehnmalvezzi.com/
 https://www.german-architects.com/en/kuehn-malvezzi-berlin/projects
 https://divisare.com/authors/44324-kuehn-malvezzi/projects/built

German companies established in 2001
Architecture firms of Germany